Al-Durr Al-Manthur Fi Tafsir Bil-Ma'thur is a Sunni tafsir (exegesis or commentary of the Qur'an, the holy book of Islam) recognized as authoritative, written by the prominent Imam Jalal al-Din al-Suyuti (d. 911 AH (1505 AD), who also co-wrote the  Tafsir al-Jalalayn. The exegesis explains each passage of the Qur'an by the reports and narrations from the Islamic prophet Muhammad, his Companions and the immediate generations following the Companions. Suyuti compiled all the reports and narrations that he could gather for each particular passage - even contradictory reports, as can be seen in the narrations gathered explaining verse 33:33:

See also

 List of Sunni books

References

External links
 Tafsir Dur al-Mansoor Urdu Translation Complete

Sunni tafsir
Books by al-Suyuti